Ammiel Alcalay (born 1956) is an American poet, scholar, critic, translator, and prose stylist. Born and raised in Boston, he is a first-generation American, son of Sephardic Jews from Serbia. His work often examines how poetry and politics affect the way we see ourselves and the way Americans think about the Middle East, with attention to methods of cultural recovery in the United States, the Middle East and Europe.

Brief overview
Alcalay is perhaps best known as a Middle Eastern scholar and university instructor. During the war in former Yugoslavia he was a primary source for providing access in the American media to Bosnian voices. He was responsible for publication of the first survivor's account in English from a victim held in a Serb concentration camp, The Tenth Circle of Hell by Rezak Hukanović (Basic Books, 1996), which he co-translated and edited.

"Over the past fifteen years", writes Alcalay, "I have focused primarily on Hebrew and Jewish literature of the Middle East, in its Islamic, Levantine Arabic, and Israeli contexts. My work on Bosnia during the war in former Yugoslavia has entailed similar efforts at creating the cultural space for unfamiliar works to emerge. Throughout, my work as poet and prose-writer remains a crucial reference point, representing a kind of standard in form and content that I insist my other writing (and translation) adheres to."

As a university instructor, Prof. Alcalay has taught Sephardic literature (both Hebrew and in-translation), and a variety of courses on Middle Eastern and Mediterranean literacy and intellectual culture and its contemporary and modern reception, at both the undergraduate and graduate levels, as well as creative writing. After Jews and Arabs: Remaking Levantine Culture (1993), Alcalay's first book of scholarship and a critical contribution to Levantine studies, was the subject of a 20th anniversary conference at Georgetown University in 2012. A comparatist by training, Alcalay specializes in these topics and in Balkan literatures and history, poetics, and theories of translation; he publishes translations of Hebrew and Bosnian, as well as his own poetry.

A versatile and prolific scholar, Alcalay has also been instrumental in recovering and promoting scholarship on the New American Poetry, insisting (as Cole Heinowitz writes) on "the necessary interrelatedness of scholarly, political, and creative endeavors and the individual and collective human experiences from which they grow." Alcalay's most recent book, A Little History (2013), examines the life and work of poet Charles Olson "against the backdrop of the Cold War and Alcalay's personal reflections on the institutionalized production of knowledge, at once investigating the historical relationship between poetry and resistance and enacting the politics of memory and imagination."

Since 2010 and with support from the Center for the Humanities at the CUNY Graduate Center, Alcalay is the initiator and general editor of Lost & Found: The CUNY Poetics Document Initiative, a series of student- and guest-edited archival texts emerging from New American Poetry. In 2017, Alcalay was awarded an American Book Award from the Before Columbus Foundation in recognition of this work.

Alcalay's poetry, prose, reviews, critical articles and translations have appeared in the New York Times Book Review, The New Yorker, Time, The New Republic, The Village Voice, The Jerusalem Post, Grand Street, Conjunctions, Sulfur, The Nation, Middle East Report, Afterimage, Parnassus, City Lights Review, Review of Jewish Social Studies, The Review of Contemporary Fiction, The Michigan Quarterly, Caliban, Paper Air, Paintbrush, Mediterraneans, and various other publications.

He is currently a professor in the English Department at the CUNY Graduate Center; and in the MFA Program in Creative Writing & Translation and the Department of Classical, Middle Eastern & Asian Languages & Cultures at Queens College.

Personal life
Alcalay's parents are Sephardi Jews who immigrated to Boston from Belgrade, Serbia, in what was then Yugoslavia. His Sephardi ancestors were originally from Spain. His father is the abstract expressionist painter Albert Alcalay.

Selected publications
 Preface, Stars Seen in Person: Selected Journals of John Wieners by John Wieners, edited by Michael Seth Stewart (City Lights, 2015)
 "Introductory comments on the occasion of Amiri Baraka's talk, 'Charles Olson and Sun Ra.' Fourth Annual Charles Olson Memorial Lecture. Cape Ann Museum, Gloucester, MA. 19 October 2013." in Letters for Olson, edited by Benjamin Hollander (Spuyten Duyvil Publishing, 2016) 
 Contributor, Homage to Etel Adnan edited by Lindsey Boldt, Steve Dickison and Samantha Giles (Post-Apollo Press, 2012)
 a little history (re:public / UpSet Press, 2012) 
 neither wit nor gold (Ugly Duckling Presse, 2011) 
 Islanders (City Lights Publishers, 2010) 
 Poetry, Politics & Translation: American Isolation and the Middle East (Palm Press, 2003) Based on a talk sponsored by the Cornell Forum for Justice and Peace in the series Critical Perspectives on the War on Terror
 from the warring factions (Beyond Baroque, 2002), a book-length poem dedicated to the Bosnian town of Srebrenica
 Memories of Our Future: Selected Essays, 1982-1999 with Juan Goytisolo (City Lights, 1999)
 After Jews and Arabs: Remaking Levantine Culture (University of Minnesota Press, 1993)  Chosen as one of the year's top 25 books by The Village Voice and named one of 1993's notable books by The Independent in London
 the cairo notebooks (Singing Horse Press, 1993) some of the earlier published poems

Translations
 Outcast, a novel by Shimon Ballas, translated from Hebrew with Oz Shelach (City Lights Press, 2007).
 Nine Alexandrias by Semezdin Mehmedinović, translated from Bosnian (City Lights, 2003)
 Sarajevo Blues by the Bosnian poet Semezdin Mehmedinović (City Lights, 1998)
 Keys to the Garden: New Israeli Writing (City Lights, 1996)

As editor
 Lost & Found: The CUNY Poetics Document Initiative (CUNY Center for the Humanities, 2010–present), as General Editor
 For this work, Alcalay is recipient of the 2017 American Book Award
 Robert Duncan in San Francisco by Michael Rumaker, co-edited with Megan Paslawski (City Lights, 2013)
 To look at the sea is to become what one is: An Etel Adnan Reader by Etel Adnan, co-edited with Thom Donovan and Brandon Shimoda (Nightboat Books, 2014)
 Portraits of Sarajevo by Zlatko Dizdarević, translated by Midhat Ridjanović (Fromm, 1995)
 Sarajevo: A War Journal  by Zlatko Dizdarević, translated by Anselm Hollo (Henry Holt, 1994)

References

External links
 Alcalay's introduction to the 4th Annual Charles Olson lecture by Amiri Baraka at the Cape Ann Museum for the Gloucester Writers Center (YouTube video) 
 Interview reel – Ammiel Alcalay on Charles Olson by Sam O'Hana (YouTube video)
 Select archive of audio recordings of Alcalay's poetry readings, public lectures and conversations from PennSound
 Notes on Alcalay's work by Cole Heinowitz for the Boston Review
 Alcalay reviews Juan Goytisolo Landscapes of War: From Sarajevo to Chechnya; Mouloud Feraoun Journal 1955–1962: Reflections on the French-Algerian War
 Republics of Poetry Alcalay himself writes on Charles Olson, poetics, etc.
 "Ammiel Alcalay and the Limits of Translation."    Interview from 2005 at Loggernaut.
 Olson Now a blog edited by Alcalay and Michael Kelleher with a focus on the poetry and poetics of Charles Olson
 at the Levantine Cultural Center
 Palm Press website Publisher of Alcalay's Poetry, Politics & Translation
  Paula Koneazny's review of Alcalay's "from the warring factions" in American Book Review, Vol. 25.

1956 births
American people of Serbian-Jewish descent
American people of Spanish-Jewish descent
American Sephardic Jews
American translators
Jewish poets
Translators from Bosnian
Jewish American academics
Jewish American writers
Poets from Massachusetts
Living people
American male poets
American Book Award winners
21st-century American Jews